Thomas Woodrow Crowson (September 9, 1918 – August 14, 1947) was an American Major League Baseball pitcher. He played for the Philadelphia Athletics during the  season. He died at age 28 when the team bus he was on crashed in North Carolina.

External links
</ref>

1918 births
1947 deaths
Albany Senators players
Baseball players from North Carolina
Greensboro Patriots players
Major League Baseball pitchers
Mayodan Millers players
Mount Airy Reds players
People from Fuquay-Varina, North Carolina
Philadelphia Athletics players
Reidsville Luckies players
Thomasville Tommies players
Toronto Maple Leafs (International League) players
Road incident deaths in North Carolina